Rear-Admiral Thomas Benjamin Stratton Adair (6 November 1861 – 12 August 1928) was a British Royal Navy officer who also served as Unionist MP for Glasgow Shettleston from December 1918 to October 1922.

He was elected as a supporter of David Lloyd George's coalition government.

Adair was the son of General Sir Charles William Adair. He entered the Navy in 1874, was promoted to the rank of commander on 1 January 1894, and to captain on 31 December 1899. From 1900 to 1902 he was a Member of the Navy's Ordnance Committee. He was appointed in command of the second class protected cruiser HMS Gladiator on 22 September 1902. After retirement from the Navy in 1906, he was Head of the Ordnance Department of W. Beardmore & Co. Ltd, Parkhead Steelworks, Glasgow.

References

External links 
 

Members of the Parliament of the United Kingdom for Glasgow constituencies
1861 births
1928 deaths
19th-century Royal Navy personnel
UK MPs 1918–1922
Unionist Party (Scotland) MPs